Tattenhall Road railway station was a railway station situated a mile to the north of the village of Tattenhall, Cheshire on the Chester and Crewe Railway that was built in 1840 linking Chester to the north-west with Crewe to the south-east.  The track now forms part of the North Wales Coast Line.

The station was named Tattenhall Road in 1872 to distinguish it from another Tattenhall railway station, a little to the west of the village, on the Whitchurch and Tattenhall Railway branch line to Whitchurch.

The station took back the name Tattenhall when the branch line closed in 1957. It was then itself closed in 1966. The station building still exists, now as a private house.

Services

References

Further reading

External links 
 Sub Brit disused station page
 North Wales Coast Railway notice board, June 2004

Disused railway stations in Cheshire
Beeching closures in England
Former London and North Western Railway stations
Railway stations in Great Britain opened in 1840
Railway stations in Great Britain closed in 1966